Carumas District is one of six districts of the province Mariscal Nieto in Peru.

Geography 
Some of the highest mountains of the district are listed below:

References